Liuyang Two-oriented Industrial Park is an agricultural products processing industrial park at province level in Liuyang City, Hunan Province, China. It is the 3rd largest one of Liuyang by economic size, after the Liuyang ETZ and HTZ. The industrial park is the original Morden Agricultural Park created in 1999, it was Changed to Agricultural Technology Industrial Park in 2007 and to the present name in 2012. Functionally, it is a demonstration area of two - oriented society, food industrial cluster, new industries demonstration area, new urban area of ecological and suitable residence.

As of 2015, its gross output value of industries is CNY 7,600 million (US$ 1,220 million), the financial revenue reaches CNY 118 million (US$ 19 million).

References 

Liuyang
Economy of Changsha
1999 establishments in China